Homebush Boys High School, founded in 1936, is a public high school for boys. It is in Homebush, in Sydney, New South Wales, Australia.

Formerly a selective high school, in 2006 Homebush Boys was regarded as one of the academically best-performing comprehensive schools, and has, in the past, been ranked above selective schools on the Higher School Certificate results.

The school has an enrolment of approximately 1208 students.

Curriculum
The school has nine faculties, being English, Mathematics, Science, Social Science, History, Music, Languages, Art, Technical and Applied Studies and PDHPE.

Homebush Boys is a consistent achiever in the Higher School Certificate (HSC) outcome, averaging 5–10 students achieving the Premier's Award every year. In 2004, a student named Martin Feng became the first Homebush Boy to score 100 in the Universities Admission Index (UAI).

Extra-curricular activities
Drum corps – participates in the annual Burwood march, the Anzac Day march through the streets of central Sydney, the Sandakan service at Burwood Park and, more recently, the Strathfield Fair. Homebush Boys is renowned for an elite performing Drum Corps, run by the Music faculty. 
Chess Team – Senior, intermediate and junior chess teams compete every Friday afternoon against other schools in the area.
Debating team – Homebush Boys has a strong tradition of debating, competing in major debating competitions in NSW.
Mock United Nations 
Public speaking – including the Toastmasters challenge that the school participates in annually.
Tournament of Minds
Student Representative Council
Prefect body
Volunteering opportunities – Homebush Boys students have frequently received John Lincoln Youth Community Service Award from the NSW Order of Australia branch, including in 2017 and 2019.

Notable alumni
Entrepreneurial
John Symond AM – Businessman; chief executive "Aussie Home Loans",

Science and education
Lionel Gilbert OAM, author and historian specializing in natural, applied, and local history.
Stephen Leeder – Medical scientist; Former dean of Medicine at the University of Sydney (1996–2002)
Alan Pettigrew – Scientist; former vice-chancellor of the University of New England (2006–2009), formerly (to 2005) chief executive officer of the National Health and Medical Research Council
Danny Stiel – Gastro-intestinal oncologist; member of AOC Medical Commission and formerly chief medical officer at the 2000 Sydney Olympics
Geoffrey Vaughan – Emeritus professor of pharmaceutical chemistry and Deputy Vice-Chancellor (1990–92) of Monash University formerly Australian Rugby Union representative player

Entertainment and the arts
Neil Armfield – Film and theatre director
Paul Furniss – Jazz musician
Alex Hood – Renowned entertainer, writer, actor and folk singer.

Politics and law
Bohdan Bilinsky – Lawyer and legal academic, Fellow of Senate, University of Sydney and Honorary Fellow of the university.
John Coates – Lawyer and businessman; president of the Australian Olympic Committee, member of the International Olympic Committee
Bob Debus – Former NSW attorney-general and environment minister; Former federal home-affairs minister
Roderick Howie – Lawyer and jurist; judge of the Supreme Court of New South Wales
Jim Lloyd former federal government minister

Sport
Rodney Blake – Rugby union player for Australia and Queensland Reds
Jonah Bolden (born 1996) – basketball player
Tim Brasher – Former Balmain Tigers NSWRL Player
Gordon Bray – Sports commentator, journalist and writer.
Tony Ford – Rugby league fullback with Western Suburbs DRLFC 
Bob Howe – tennis player who won five doubles Grand Slam and four mixed doubles Grand Slam titles.
Phillip Hughes – NSW and Australian cricketer.
Mitchell Starc – NSW and Australian cricketer
Arthur Summons – Rugby union and rugby league player; international representative in both codes and former captain Western Suburbs DRLFC and Australian rugby league teams
Don Talbot – Swimming coach
Peter Vassella - Olympian (1964), sprinter
Saxon White – former rugby union international (Wallaby).
Jonah Bolden – Professional NBA basketball player

Notable former staff
Dave Anderson – Australian Olympic oarsman in 1952 and 1956. Rowed King's Cup 1950, 51, 52, 53, 54, 55, 56, 57; Henley 1952; New Zealand 1951; and was in winning coxed-fours crew at Empire Games, 1954
Darrel Chapman – Representative rugby league player (Australia and NSW), team captain of South Sydney between 1961 and 1964, subsequently lectured in sports sciences at Southern Cross University taught physical education 1963.
Vincent Durick – Maths teacher; MLA for Lakemba, 1964–84, deceased 1996.
Peter Philpott – English/history teacher; New South Wales and Australian cricketer
Andrew Watson – Antarctic explorer who accompanied Douglas Mawson's 1911–14 Australasian Antarctic Expedition, as a geologist and photographer, was headmaster from 1946 to 1949.

See also
 List of Government schools in New South Wales

References

External links
School Website
Memories of 1956–57 year

Educational institutions established in 1936
1936 establishments in Australia
Boys' schools in New South Wales
Public high schools in Sydney